Ipatovsky District is an administrative district (raion), one of the twenty-six in Stavropol Krai, Russia. Municipally, it is incorporated as Ipatovsky Municipal District. It is located in the north of the krai. Its administrative center is the town of Ipatovo. Population:  69,268 (2002 Census); 64,725 (1989 Census). The population of Ipatovo accounts for 41.5% of the district's total population.

References

Notes

Sources

Districts of Stavropol Krai